Charles Otto Hartman (August 10, 1888 – October 22, 1960) was a left-handed pitcher in Major League Baseball who played briefly in the American League during the 1908 season.

He split that season between Fresno and the Seattle Siwashes. In , he pitched for the Portland Beavers, compiling a record of 11–14 with a 2.82 ERA. His performance caught the attention of the Boston Red Sox, for whom he made his only major league appearance on June 24, 1908 as a reliever. In two innings of work, he allowed one earned run with one strikeout and two walks and never appeared in a professional baseball game again.

Hartman died in his home-town of Los Angeles, California, at the age of 72.

Sources

Retrosheet

Boston Red Sox players
Major League Baseball pitchers
Baseball players from Los Angeles
1888 births
1960 deaths
Fresno Raisin Eaters players
Seattle Siwashes players
Portland Beavers players